This table displays the top-rated primetime television series of the 2012–13 season as measured by Nielsen Media Research.

References

2012 in American television
2013 in American television
2012-related lists
2013-related lists
Lists of American television series